Acantholipes acephala is a species of moth in the family Erebidae. It is found in the Democratic Republic of the Congo.

References

acephala
Moths described in 1912
Moths of Africa
Endemic fauna of the Democratic Republic of the Congo